Lenore Hardy Barrett (born June 16, 1934) was a Republican member of the Idaho Legislature. Barrett  served in the Idaho House of Representatives from 1992 to 2014.

Education and career
Barrett graduated from Ponca City High School, Oklahoma, and earned her bachelor's degree from Oklahoma Baptist University in 1956. Barrett was a director of the Salmon River Electric co-operative. Barrett was a Police Commissioner and Challis City Council member from 1984-1989.

Political career
Barrett held seat B in District 26 Seat B until 2002, when she was elected to seat B in Idaho House District 35. District 35. Following the 2010 census, she was redistricted into District 8 Seat B where she served until 2014.

Committee assignments
Barrett was a member of these committees: 
Local Government (Chair)
Resources and Conservation
Revenue and Taxation

Elections

Idaho House of Representatives District 26 Seat B 

1992

1994

Re-elected with 8,913 votes (81.0%) against Donovan Bramwell (L).

1996

Re-elected with 10,088 votes (79.6%) against Donovan Bramwell (L).

1998

Re-elected with 7,772 votes (69.9%) against DelRay Holm (D).

2000

Re-elected with 9,992 votes (76.8%) against Kathy Richmond (D).

Idaho House of Representatives District 35 Seat B 

2002

Redistricted to 35B; re-elected with 11,687 votes.

2004

Re-elected with 14,114 votes (98.8%) against write-in Jon Winegarner (I).

2006

Re-elected with 10,041 votes (72.09%) against Jon Winegarner (D).

2008

Barrett defeated Isaiah Womack in the Republican Primary with 71.3% of the vote.

Barrett was unopposed in the general election.

2010

Barrett defeated Robert E. Cope and Joel M. Lloyd in the Republican primary with 52.5%.

Barrett was unopposed in the general election.

Idaho House of Representatives District 8 Seat B 

2012

Barrett defeated Merrill Beyeler, K. LaVon Dresen and Kenny Keene in the Republican primary with 37.1% of the vote.

Barrett defeated Cindy Phelps (D) in the general election with 63.8% of the vote.

Barrett endorsed Ron Paul in the Republican Party presidential primaries, 2012.

2014

Barrett was defeated for re-election in the Republican primary by Merrill Beyeler, only getting 34.2% of the vote.

Personal life
Barrett has six children and resides in Challis, Idaho. Her husband Robert died in 2010.

References

External links
 
 Biography at Ballotpedia
 Financial information (state office) at the National Institute for Money in State Politics]

1934 births
Living people
Republican Party members of the Idaho House of Representatives
Oklahoma Baptist University alumni
People from Kay County, Oklahoma
Women state legislators in Idaho
People from Custer County, Idaho
20th-century American politicians
20th-century American women politicians
21st-century American politicians
21st-century American women politicians